Koflandé Forest is a protected forest in Burkina Faso. 
It is located in Comoé Province.

It has an elevation of 274 metres. The Forest of Koflandé is south of Forêt de la Koflandé.

References

Protected areas of Burkina Faso
Comoé Province